Brother's Day is a 2019 Indian Malayalam-language action thriller film written and directed by Kalabhavan Shajohn in his directorial debut. Produced by Listin Stephen, the film stars Prithviraj Sukumaran, Prasanna, Aishwarya Lekshmi, Madonna Sebastian, Prayaga Martin and Miya George. The film marks the debut of Prasanna as actor and Dhanush as singer and lyricist in Malayalam cinema. Music for the film was composed by 4 Musics.

Principal photography began on 16 March 2019 and was completed in mid-July after a 96-day long filming. The film was released in theatres worldwide on 6 September 2019.

Plot
The plot revolves around a young boy named Siva, whose father is an alcoholic and treats him very badly because he doubts about his paternity on Siva and blames his wife for it. Later, his mother gives birth to a baby girl and dies while laboring. Siva names her Peeli, and starts taking care of his sister. Siva and his sister share a beautiful and soulful bond. With time, both grow and come very close to each other. One day, when Siva returns home he sees his father's friend trying to molest Peeli with his father's consent. Enraged, Siva kills his father and his father's friend, and walks out of the house with Peeli, but finds many people surrounding the house. Siva tries to escape with Peeli, but the latter who is in a state of shock after seeing her father dying refuses to move with her brother, but Siva escapes.

Years later, Rony is a part of the catering team at his boss's daughter's wedding, serving people at the wedding, where he meets Jema and suspects her of crashing the wedding, but learns that she is the daughter of his boss. They both start to like each other. Rony is then sent to pick up a tourist named Chandy by one of his friends. When he reaches the bus stop he finds Chandy on the roof of the bus. It is shown that Chandy is an alcoholic and very difficult to handle. While taking Chandy back to his friend's hotel Rony is interrupted by some local college students who try to stop him from taking tourists as his friend does not have a license. Rony gets into a fight and thrashes all the students. When they reach the hotel, Rony learns that the Chandy he brought was someone else. 

When Chandy, Rony and Jema go-to hangout Rony narrates a tragic past. Ruby was in love with his friend and both got married and went on their honeymoon, but are later found in the jungle where his friend has been killed by someone and his sister is in critical condition. Later, Chandy meets with an accident and breaks his left leg. Rony goes to help him and becomes with Chandy. It is revealed that Chandy is actually a businessman, who introduces his daughter, Santa to Rony. One day he takes Santa to meet his sister Ruby. Rony finds out about Shiva, a notorious criminal who is responsible for the death of his friend and injuries of his sister. A series of events are shown to showcase the crimes Shiva has committed. 

It is revealed that Santa is Peeli and was adopted by Chandi when she was an orphan. Later it is revealed by the nuns from the orphanage that Shiva is not her brother and her brother had passed away in an accident as he was being chased by the villagers for killing his father. Shiva learnt of this story from a distant relative of Santa and manipulates Santa for money and to accompany him for certain crimes. Santa is blackmailed by Shiva for money. When she reaches a jungle to provide money to Shiva, he tries to kill her, but holds her as a hostage in a place. When Chandy and Rony learn about this, they head to search for Santa. Rony goes into the jungle to find Santa whereas Chandy stays in the car. Rony finds Santa and tries to escape, but Shiva appears with his goons. 

Rony fights with the goons while Shiva takes Santa. Rony rushes behind Shiva and both engage in hand-to-hand combat. Rony hits Shiva and takes Santa with him. Shiva then tries to kill them with a rod where Chandy comes and hits him with the car. Ruby recovers and Rony takes her home. While packing, Ruby watching a news related to a murder in the same place where she was attacked. The investigation begin and the victim is shown to be Shiva. A flashback is revealed that Rony killed Shiva with the same rod. Rony, Jema and Ruby are going on a long drive, where the cop, who is investigates the case, concludes to the media that the tigers are often present in this forest so he tells that it is attacked by a tiger.

Cast

Production
Brother's Day marks the directorial and screenwriter debut of actor Kalabhavan Shajohn. It was at the sets of Oozham (2016) that Shajohn narrated the screenplay to Prithviraj. Shajohn had no plans of directing the film at that time. He asked Prithviraj to recommend anyone and Prithviraj encouraged Shajohn to direct the film himself and agreed to act provided that he direct. Produced by Listin Stephen, the film was made on a budget of 6 crore. Shajohn describes the film as a "family thriller".Miya, Aishwarya Lekshmi, Madonna Sebastian and Prayaga Martin  plays the four female lead roles. The film marks the Malayalam film debut of actor Prasanna. Principal photography began on 16 March 2019. After a 96-day long shoot the film was wrapped in mid-July 2019. The film was shot in locations such as Pollachi, Kuttikkanam, Ernakulam, and Munnar.

Soundtrack

The music for the film was composed by the ensemble group 4 Music and Nadirshah. Dhanush penned and sung the Tamil song "Nenjodu Vinaa", marking his singing debut in Malayalam films. Madhu Vasudevan, B. K. Harinarayanan, Jis Joy, Nellai Jayantha were the other lyricists.

Release
Brother's Day was released in theatres worldwide on 6 September 2019, ahead of the Onam week in Kerala.

References

External links
 
 

2010s Malayalam-language films
Indian action thriller films
2019 directorial debut films
2019 films
2019 action thriller films
Films shot in Pollachi